Faalogo Iosefa Sopi is a Samoan politician and former member of the Legislative Assembly of Samoa. He is a member of the Human Rights Protection Party.

He was first elected to the Legislative Assembly at the 2016 Samoan general election. In 2021 he complained in parliament that police and prison services members had low standards of physical fitness and were "getting fat". He lost his seat in the 2021 election.

References

Living people
Members of the Legislative Assembly of Samoa
Human Rights Protection Party politicians
Year of birth missing (living people)